Hemicaranx amblyrhynchus (bluntnose jack) is a tropical marine fish in the jack family (Carangidae). It is found in shallow parts of the western Atlantic Ocean.

Description
The bluntnose jack is a deep bodied fish with a large, deeply forked tail fin. The dorsal fin is divided in two parts and has 8 spines and 27 soft rays. The long anal fin tapers towards the tail and has 3 spines and 23 soft rays.

Distribution
Its range extends from North Carolina, through the Gulf of Mexico an southwards to Florianópolis in Brazil. It is largely absent from the Lesser Antilles.

Ecology
The bluntnose jack is sometimes associated with the jellyfish, Lychnorhiza lucerna.

References

amblyrhynchus
Fish described in 1833
Taxa named by Georges Cuvier